Blue Lambency Downward is the third studio album by American avant-garde metal band Kayo Dot, released on Hydra Head Records in May 2008. After much of the group left to pursue outside projects, the only members who remained were frontman Toby Driver and violinist and long-time collaborator Mia Matsumiya. The two began recording the album in early 2007 using a revolving door of contributing musicians. The album is heavily influenced by chamber and orchestral music and jazz, and features an abundance of woodwinds. It is widely considered to be Kayo Dot's least heavy album to date.

The ensuing tour featured a mostly new group of musicians: Patrick Wolff on woodwinds, Daniel Means on woodwinds and guitar, David Bodie on drums, and Terran Olson on woodwinds and keyboards. Much of the lineup would stay the same for the recording of their next album, Coyote.

Reception

The album received mixed reviews. Pitchfork Media criticized it for a lack of memorability, giving it a 3.3 out of 10, while AllMusic was more favorable, giving the album 4 out of 5 stars. Drowned in Sound gave the album a 7 out of 10 stars.

Track listing
All songs and lyrics written by Toby Driver.

Personnel
Toby Driver - acoustic, electric, 12-string, baritone, and bass guitars; clarinet; voice; piano; organ; gamelan; analog synth; laptop mellotron
Mia Matsumiya - violin, voice, mellotron, synth bass
Charlie Zeleny - drums
Skerik - tenor and baritone sax, vibraphone
Hans Teuber - soprano and bass clarinets, alto sax, flute
Dave Abramson - gamelan and additional percussion
B.R.A.D. - additional vocals
Randall Dunn - sound effects and synth design

References

2008 albums
Kayo Dot albums
Hydra Head Records albums